Newcastle United Women is an English women's football club, affiliated with Newcastle United F.C. They were founded in 1989. They are based at the Newcastle United Academy Training Centre, Benton, Newcastle upon Tyne, and play their home matches at Kingston Park, Kingston Park, Newcastle upon Tyne.

In the summer of 2016, they became officially affiliated with Newcastle United F.C, operating independently with the support of the Newcastle United Foundation. In August 2022, restructuring meant that the women's team was brought under the complete ownership of Newcastle United, with plans to transition to full-time football.

History
In 1989, Newcastle United W.F.C. was formed and played competitively, their main local rivals being Cowgate Kestrels. In 1996, the pinnacle of this era was undoubtedly their appearance at the world-famous Wembley Stadium. Prior to the Newcastle United v Manchester United FA Charity Shield match, the girls took on a Manchester United women's side, losing 2–0.

In 1999, the club achieved promotion to the Northern Combination Women's Football League from the NWRFL and also won the league cup. The club continued to grow with a thriving youth set up and use of the excellent facilities at University of Northumbria.

During 2001, the club was now well established in the top half of the Northern Combination League, and through its partnership with Newcastle City Council's Football Development Scheme, a five-year plan was put in place in August to reach the FA Women's Premier League. Those five years have seen the club achieve major success on and off the field, winning the Northumberland FA Senior Cup on a record five consecutive occasions.

The club was now seen as a major force in women's football running teams from Under 10s, U12s, U13s, U14s, and three open age squads with over 120 club members and during 2003–04 season they finished runners up behind Stockport County in the Northern Combination League. In 2004, the club ventured into European competition entering the Lloret Cup, Barcelona, winning the competition and also the fair play award. The club has also played in the MIC in Barcelona against International players from Mexico, Spain and Sweden.

The club was now recognised by The Football Association for good practice and coach development and gained the prestigious FA Charter Standard Award.

Following a Northern Combination League runners up spot behind Stockport County in 2003, the elusive promotion into the FA Women's Premier League Northern Division was eventually secured in the season 2004–05 on the back of the league's best defensive record of only conceding 16 goals in 18 games. In May the club was recognised for its achievements and was given a civic reception to mark the occasion of being presented with the League Trophy and NFA Senior Cup.  In June, to the delight of all members past and present, the club was renamed Newcastle United Women's Football Club.

In July, the club launched the official NUWFC website.

During the 2006–07 season, the club preserved its Premier League status, finishing a creditable 8th, and reached the FA Women's Cup quarter finals for the first time ever, losing to Liverpool 9–8 on penalties following a 2–2 draw. The final away game of the season took place at Ewood Park against champions elect Blackburn Rovers. In May the club was honoured by The Football Association and received the Nationwide Club of the Year award in London.

The club ended the season on a high winning their first ever international trophy by lifting the Y.E.S Cup (Year of Exercise and Sport) beating Liverpool, FC Barcelona Femenino and Gateshead Academy over the three-day event.

In August 2013 the club has announced a deal which will see Wonga.com become the club's principal sponsor for the 2013/14 season. This is the first time that an official Newcastle United FC club sponsor has also committed themselves to the women's team, demonstrating the growing importance nationally of women's football.

In the 2015/2016 season the club achieved their highest ever finish in the third tier of Women's football, finishing 9th under manager Thomas Butler. As well as the first team securing their highest ever finish, they also reached the semi-final of the FAWPL Plate, where they were defeated by Enfield Town. The club's development side went on to win the FA Women's Premier League Reserve Division Northern under the management team of Andrew Inness and Alex Curran.

In the pre-season of 2016, there was a change of management at the club. Former Newcastle United and Sunderland Ladies player, Victoria Greenwell, taking over as first team manager. Jill Stacey took over as development team manager, retaining Alex Curran and adding Ross Flintoft to the coaching set up.

From 2017, Newcastle United Women became part of Newcastle United Foundation, the registered charity arm of Newcastle United FC, although still remaining independently owned.

From the 2019/20 season, a two-year strategic partnership was announced with Newcastle United Foundation and Northumbria University to provide Strength and Conditioning, Performance Analysis and Physiotherapy support for the team. In addition, the new Head of Women's Football at Northumbria University, Becky Langley, assumed a dual responsibility to manage and lead Newcastle United Women combined with leading Northumbria University Performance Football squads.

On the 1st May 2022, Newcastle United Women played their first game at St James Park, in front of a crowd of 22,134, with the team winning 4-0 over Alnwick Town Ladies. The crowd was the highest at an English League game despite Newcastle playing in the 4th tier.

Current squad

Updated 21 January 2023

Former players

Management

First Team

Honours

Northern Combination Women's Football League:
Winners: 2011–12
Runners-up: 2003–04

Combination League Cup:
2004–05

Northern Combination League Cup:
1998–99

Northumberland FA Senior Cup: 7
2000–01, 2001–02, 2002–03, 2003–04, 2004–05, 2007–08, 2011–12

Y.E.S Cup (Year of Exercise and Sport):
2006–07

Lloret Cup:
2003–04

Nationwide Club of the Year:
2006–07

John O'Farrell Charity Cup:
2009–10

FA Women's Premier League Reserve Division North: 1
2015–16

References

External links
 Newcastle United Women's Team
 Official Website 

Newcastle United F.C.
Association football clubs established in 1989
Women's football clubs in England
Football clubs in Tyne and Wear
1989 establishments in England
FA Women's National League teams